Enrique Contreras III (born May 22, 1992) is a Mexican professional stock car racing driver. He has competed in the NASCAR Xfinity Series, NASCAR Camping World Truck Series, and most notably, NASCAR Mexico Series. He is the son of former Indy Lights racer Enrique Contreras II and nephew of NASCAR driver Carlos Contreras.

Racing career

Regional series

Mexico Series
Contreras has run the full schedule before, in 2011, 2014 and 2015. He broke through in 2014, scoring his first four top ten finishes while finishing all but one race (mechanical problems at Nuevo Autodromo de Queretaro). In 2015, he added three more top tens, with just one crash.

K&N Pro Series East
Contreras made his K&N Pro Series East debut in 2012, driving four races. He recorded a best finish of 11th at Greenville-Pickens Speedway. In 2013, Contreras ran the first three races of the season, scoring 25th at Bristol Motor Speedway, 19th at Greensville-Pickens and 24th at Five Flags Speedway.

National series

Camping World Truck Series
Contreras debuted in 2014, driving the No. 07 RaceTrac Chevrolet Silverado for Rick Ware Racing and SS-Green Light Racing to a 20th-place finish at Martinsville Speedway. He returned to the Truck Series in 2016, driving the No. 71 Chevrolet Silverado for his family Contreras Motorsports at Gateway, finishing 20th.

Xfinity Series
Contreras' first race was the 2015 Axalta Faster. Tougher. Brighter. 200 for Rick Ware Racing, finishing 34th in the No. 15 Adhler Pinturas/Coen Supply Chevrolet Camaro.

Motorsports career results

NASCAR
(key) (Bold – Pole position awarded by qualifying time. Italics – Pole position earned by points standings or practice time. * – Most laps led.)

Xfinity Series

Camping World Truck Series

 Season still in progress
 Ineligible for series points

References

External links
 

1992 births
Living people
Racing drivers from Mexico City
NASCAR drivers